Vrbica Stefanov (born December 19, 1973) is a retired Macedonian professional basketball player and later was a head coach of Macedonian basketball team Kožuv.

Professional career
After starting his basketball career with Tikveš, Stefanov played six seasons with MZT Aerodrom (1992–1998), then passed to Rabotnički (1998–1999), Karsiyaka Izmir (1999–2000, Turkey), AEK Athens (2000–2001, Greece). He then remained for four years in Italy, in the Montepaschi Siena (2001–2005), where he reached a Euroleague Final Four.

He has won the 1998–99 Macedonian National Championship with Rabotnički, the 2001 Greek National Cup with AEK Athens, the 2002 Saporta Cup with Montepaschi Siena, the 2003–04 Italian National Championship with Montepaschi Siena, and the 2005-06 Turkish National Championship with Ülkerspor. He was also the captain of the Macedonian national team and played at the 1999 European Championship and the 2007 European Championship qualification.

After he signed with KK Crvena zvezda, he played only one game, in October 2006 and said that would retire from playing basketball.

In February 2007 he signed for the ACB's ViveMenorca in Spain, for all the remaining season and the following one.

On 23 March 2009, Vrbica Stefanov was awarded the Medal for Service to the Country by the then-president of the Republic of Macedonia Branko Crvenkovski in acknowledgement of his sport achievements and his contribution to developing and popularizing sport in Macedonia as well as promoting the country abroad.

Honors

Club honors
Macedonian League - 1999 with Rabotnicki
Greek Cup - 2001 with AEK
Saporta Cup - 2002 with Montepaschi
Italian League - 2004, 2007 with Montepaschi
Turkish League - 2006 with Ülker
Individual honors
Macedonian Sportspersonality of the year - 1998, 1999, 2000, 2001, 2003
Greek All Star - 2001
Italian All Star - 2005

References

External links
 Vrbica Stefanov at euroleague.net

1973 births
Living people
ABA League players
AEK B.C. players
Karşıyaka basketball players
KK Crvena zvezda players
Liga ACB players
Macedonian expatriate basketball people in Serbia
Macedonian expatriate basketball people in Spain
Macedonian men's basketball players
Menorca Bàsquet players
Mens Sana Basket players
Mersin Büyükşehir Belediyesi S.K. players
Olympiacos B.C. players
Sportspeople from Kavadarci
Ülker G.S.K. basketball players
Point guards